Eugene Huu-Chau "Gene" Trinh (Vietnamese: Trịnh Hữu Châu, born September 14, 1950) is a Vietnamese American biochemist who flew aboard NASA Space Shuttle mission STS-50 as a Payload Specialist, becoming the first Vietnamese American astronaut in space and the second Vietnamese in space (after cosmonaut Phạm Tuân).

Biography
Trinh was born in Saigon, South Vietnam. Trinh moved with his parents to Paris, France, when he was two years old. He came to the United States to study when he was 18 and later became an American citizen.

Trinh graduated from Lycee Michelet in Paris, France, in 1968 with a baccalaureate degree. He received a Bachelor of Science degree in Mechanical Engineering-Applied Physics from Columbia University in 1972. He then studied at Yale University, earning a Masters of Science in 1974, a Masters of Philosophy in 1975, and a Doctorate of Philosophy in Applied Physics in 1977.

See also
 List of Asian American astronauts
 Phạm Tuân (first Vietnamese/Asian in space)

References

External links
 

1950 births
American astronauts
Columbia School of Engineering and Applied Science alumni
Vietnamese expatriates in France
Living people
People from Culver City, California
People from McLean, Virginia
People from Ho Chi Minh City
Vietnamese emigrants to the United States
Vietnamese astronauts
Yale University alumni
American aviators of Asian descent
Space Shuttle program astronauts